= Institute of Insect Sciences, Zhejiang University =

Institute of Insect Sciences (Traditional Chinese: 浙江大學昆蟲科學研究所, Simplified Chinese: 浙江大学昆虫科学研究所), is a research institute of the Zhejiang University, People's Republic of China.

== Introduction ==
The institute is located in the Zijingang Campus, Yuhangtang Road, Zhejiang University.

The institute mainly studies entomology and its applications, especially in the agricultural aspects. It currently holds the national key program of the Agricultural Entomology and Pest Control.

The institute also offers postgraduate educations on entomology and agricultural sciences. Currently there are about 50 master's students and 55 PhD candidates working in the institute. It has 17 full professors as well as other support staff and researchers.
